William Whaley Hall (September 6, 1941 – March 7, 2015) was an American football offensive tackle in the National Football League (NFL) for the Dallas Cowboys. He also was a member of the Philadelphia Bulldogs in the Continental Football League. He played college football at the University of Mississippi.

Early years
Hall attended Hewitt-Trussville High School, where he played football (tackle and fullback) and baseball (pitcher). He accepted a football scholarship from the University of Mississippi.

In 1962, he was a two-way tackle on a team that went undefeated (10-0), won a Southeastern Conference title and a share of the national championship. 

As a senior, he was named co-captain of a team that repeated as Southeastern Conference champions and played in the 1964 Sugar Bowl. He was voted as the SEC Most Outstanding Lineman by the Birmingham Touchdown Club. He played three seasons, helping his team achieve a 26-3-2 record and receive invitations to two Sugar Bowls and one Cotton Bowl.

In 1995, he was inducted into the Ole Miss Sports Hall of Fame.

Professional career

Dallas Cowboys
Hall was selected by the Dallas Cowboys in the fourth round (48th overall) of the 1963 NFL Draft with a future draft pick, which allowed the team to draft him before his college eligibility was over. In 1964, he made the team as a backup offensive guard, but did not play a down as a rookie. He was released before the start of the 1965 season.

Philadelphia Bulldogs (CFL)
In 1965, he signed with the Philadelphia Bulldogs of the Continental Football League. The next year, he helped the team win the league's championship.

Personal life
Whaley died on March 7, 2015, after an extended illness at age 73.

References

1941 births
2015 deaths
People from Trussville, Alabama
Players of American football from Alabama
American football offensive guards
Ole Miss Rebels football players
Dallas Cowboys players